The modern constellation Auriga lies across two of the quadrants symbolized by the White Tiger of the West (西方白虎, Xī Fāng Bái Hǔ) and the Vermillion Bird of the South (南方朱雀, Nán Fāng Zhū Què), and Three Enclosures (三垣, Sān Yuán), that divide the sky in traditional Chinese uranography.

The name of the western constellation in modern Chinese is 御夫座 (yù fū zuò), meaning "the driving man constellation".

Stars
The map of Chinese constellation in constellation Auriga area consists of :

See also
Traditional Chinese star names
Chinese constellations
List of constellations by area

References

External links
Auriga – Chinese associations
 香港太空館研究資源
 中國星區、星官及星名英譯表
 天象文學
 台灣自然科學博物館天文教育資訊網
 中國古天文
 中國古代的星象系統

Astronomy in China
Auriga (constellation)